The name Jova has been used for six tropical cyclones in the Eastern Pacific Ocean:
 Hurricane Jova (1981)
 Hurricane Jova (1987)
 Hurricane Jova (1993)
 Hurricane Jova (2005), passed near Hawaii but did not affect land 
 Hurricane Jova (2011), a Category 3 hurricane, made landfall in Mexico as a Category 2 hurricane
 Tropical Storm Jova (2017), did not affect land

Pacific hurricane set index articles